The Eurovision Song Contest 1975 was the 20th edition of the annual Eurovision Song Contest. Organised by the European Broadcasting Union (EBU) and host broadcaster Sveriges Radio (SR), the contest was held at Stockholmsmässan on 22 March 1975, and was hosted by Swedish television director Karin Falck. It was the first time that the contest had taken place in Sweden.

Nineteen countries participated in the contest, beating the previous record of eighteen, that was first set in the 1965 edition. France and Malta returned after their one-year and two-year absences, respectively. Turkey made its debut, while Greece decided not to enter after its debut the year prior.

The winner of the contest was the Netherlands who won with the song "Ding-a-dong", performed by Teach-In, written by Will Luikinga and Eddy Ouwens, and composed by Dick Bakker. The country would not win again until .

Location 

The contest took place in Stockholm, the capital and largest city of Sweden, which has long been one of the country's cultural, media, political, and economic centres as well as the most populated urban area in Scandinavia.

The venue for the contest was Stockholmsmässan (or Stockholm International Fairs in English). The main building is in Älvsjö – a southern suburb of Stockholm Municipality for which the building got its nickname. It was constructed in 1971 and holds 4,000 people.

Format 
To introduce each song, all the artists were recorded on videotape painting a portrait of themselves during the rehearsal period, incorporating their nation's flag into the illustration. Some artists included their backing artists in the painting, others chose only to paint the lead singer.

This year a new scoring system was implemented. Each country would be represented by a jury of 11 members, at least half of whom had to be under the age of 26. Each jury member had to award every song a mark of between 1 and 5 points, but could not vote for their own nation's entry. The votes were cast immediately after the song was performed and collected by the adjudicator straight away. After the last song was performed, the jury secretary added up all the votes cast and awarded 12 points to the song with the highest score, 10 to the second highest score, then 8 to the third, and so forth down to 1 point for the song ranked 10th. The 12–1 points system remained in use until . The jury spokesperson then announced the ten scores in the order the songs were presented when called upon by the hostess. The hostess Karin Falck several times confused the new system with questions like "How much is seven in France?"

Unlike today, the points were not given in order (from 1 up to 12), but in the order the songs were performed. The current procedure of announcing the scores in ascending order, beginning with 1 point, was not established until 1980. This scoring system remained in use until 1996, although the number of jurors varied (it was 11 from 1975 to 1987, and 16 from 1988 to 1997) and the scores they awarded each song increased to 10 rather than 5. In from 1997, some juries were replaced by televotes and from 1998, all countries were encouraged to televote when possible.

In the 2009 final and the 2010 semi-finals, the juries were reintroduced to provide 50% of the scores. Despite these changes in how the points were decided, the 'douze points' scoring system remained in place from 1975–2015. In 2016 it was altered to each country providing two separate sets of points, however, modelled after the former model.

Participating countries 

Nineteen countries took part in the contest; As a result of Turkey competing in the competition for the very first time, Greece decided not to enter after its 1974 debut in protest at the Turkish participation due to the Turkish invasion of Cyprus that had occurred the year before. Meanwhile, France and Malta returned to the contest after having been absent for one and two years, respectively .

The Portuguese entry "Madrugada" was an unabashed celebration of the Carnation Revolution, during which the country's 1974 Eurovision entry had played a pivotal practical role. According to author and historian John Kennedy O'Connor in his book The Eurovision Song Contest – The Official History, the Portuguese performer had to be dissuaded from wearing his Portuguese army uniform and carrying a gun onto the stage. Some competitors (notably Portugal and Yugoslavia) opted to perform their songs in English for the rehearsals heard by the judges, but in their native tongue at the final. Others, such as Belgium and Germany, opted for a mix of their own language and English.

Conductors 
Each performance had a conductor who conducted the orchestra.

 Harry van Hoof
 Colman Pearce
 
 
 Phil Coulter
 Carsten Klouman
 
 
 Alyn Ainsworth
 Vince Tempera
 Francis Bay
 
 Timur Selçuk
 André Popp
 Ossi Runne
 
 Juan Carlos Calderón
 Lars Samuelson

Returning artists

Participants and results

Detailed voting results

12 points 
Below is a summary of all 12 points in the final:

Spokespersons 

Listed below is the order in which votes were cast during the 1975 contest along with the spokesperson who was responsible for announcing the votes for their respective country.

 Dick van Bommel
 Brendan Balfe
 Marc Menant
 
 TBC
 
 Michel Stocker
 Dragana Marković
 Ray Moore
 TBC
 
 
 Bülent Osma
 Carole Chabrier
 Kaarina Pönniö
 Ana Zanatti
 José María Íñigo
 Sven Lindahl

Broadcasts 

Each participating broadcaster was required to relay the contest via its networks. Non-participating EBU member broadcasters were also able to relay the contest as "passive participants". Broadcasters were able to send commentators to provide coverage of the contest in their own native language and to relay information about the artists and songs to their television viewers.

Known details on the broadcasts in each country, including the specific broadcasting stations and commentators are shown in the tables below. In addition to the participating countries, the contest was also reportedly broadcast via Intervision to Eastern European countries, and in Hong Kong, Iceland, Japan, Jordan and South Korea. A planned broadcast in Chile was prevented by Sveriges Radio, following pressure from the Swedish Musicians' Union in opposition to the military dictatorship in the country.

Notable incidents 
Intelligence reports at the time pointed out the festival as a possible target for a terrorist attack by the Red Army Faction which forced the organizers to tighten security considerably. The attack struck the West German embassy in Stockholm instead about a month later (see West German embassy siege).

The Swedish left movement protested against the contest and its commercial aspect. At first the criticism was directed towards SR for the huge amount of money they spent on the contest but soon the protests developed into a movement against commercial music overall. When the Eurovision Song Contest took place an alternative festival was organized in another part of Stockholm where anybody who wanted could perform a song. Sillstryparn's entry "Doin' the omoralisk schlagerfestival" (Doin' the immoral Eurovision festival) with lyrics criticizing the commercialised nature and lacking moral integrity of Eurovision, was the most popular song from the alternative event. In the autumn of 1975 SR informed that Sweden would not participate in the 1976 edition of the Eurovision Song Contest due to the high costs that came with hosting the show. The rules later changed so that the costs were split more equally between the participating broadcasters. In the end, SR did not broadcast the 1976 contest. A concert film starring Cornelis Vreeswijk aired in its place.

Swedish TV technicians refused to broadcast the festival to Chile, where Canal 13 (an associate member of the EBU) had plans to air it. The refusal was in protest to the military dictatorship that has been ruling the country since the 1973 Chilean coup d'etat led by Augusto Pinochet.

Notes

References

External links 

 
1975
Music festivals in Sweden
1975 in music
1975 in Sweden
1970s in Stockholm
March 1975 events in Europe